Hardin Township, Iowa may refer to one of the following places in Iowa:

Hardin Township, Greene County, Iowa
Hardin Township, Hardin County, Iowa
Hardin Township, Johnson County, Iowa
Hardin Township, Pottawattamie County, Iowa
Hardin Township, Webster County, Iowa

See also
Hardin Township (disambiguation)

Iowa township disambiguation pages